Sobey Martin (27 June 1909 – 27 July 1978) was an American director of television and short films, mainly in the 1950s and 1960s. Martin directed the film Four Nights of the Full Moon (1963), starring an international ensemble cast led by Gene Tierney. However, he is probably best remembered for his prolific work on the Irwin Allen TV series Lost in Space, The Time Tunnel, Voyage to the Bottom of the Sea and Land of the Giants.

Selected filmography
 Freddy in the Wild West (1964)

External links

American film directors
American television directors
English-language film directors
German-language film directors
1909 births
1978 deaths